Richard Fitzalan, 3rd Earl of Arundel, 8th Earl of Surrey (c. 1313 – 24 January 1376) was an English nobleman and medieval military leader and distinguished admiral. Arundel was one of the wealthiest nobles, and most loyal noble retainer of the chivalric code that governed the reign of Edward III of England.

Early life
Richard was born c. 1313 in Sussex, England. Fitzalan was the eldest son of Edmund Fitzalan, 2nd Earl of Arundel, and his wife Alice de Warenne. His parents married after 30 December 1304, after his father had initially been fined for refusing to marry Alice in 1304; their betrothal had been arranged by Alice's grandfather the Earl of Surrey, his father's guardian. Arundel changed his mind after the Earl died, leaving Alice the heiress presumptive, and with her only brother married to a ten-year-old girl. His maternal grandparents were William de Warenne and Joan de Vere. William was the only son of John de Warenne, 6th Earl of Surrey (himself son of Maud Marshal by her second marriage), and his wife Alice de Lusignan (died 1256), half-sister of Henry III of England.

Civil career 

Around 1321, Fitzalan's father allied with Edward II's favourites, Hugh le Despenser, 1st Earl of Winchester and his namesake son, and Richard was married to Isabel le Despenser, daughter of Hugh the Younger. Fortune turned against the Despenser party, and on 17 November 1326, Fitzalan's father was executed.  He did not succeed to his father's estates or titles. However, political conditions had changed by 1330, and over the next few years Richard was gradually able to reacquire the Earldom of Arundel as well as the great estates his father had held in Sussex and in the Welsh Marches.

Beyond this, in 1334 he was made Justiciar of North Wales (later his term in this office was made for life), in 1336 Constable of Portchester Castle (until 1338), and in 1339 High Sheriff of Caernarvonshire and Governor of Caernarfon Castle for life. He was one of the most trusted supporters of Edward the Black Prince in Wales.

Naval and military service during the Hundred Years' War 

Despite his high offices in Wales, in the following decades Arundel spent much of his time fighting in Scotland (during the Second Wars of Scottish Independence) and France (during the Hundred Years' War). In 1337, Arundel was made joint commander of the English army in the north, and the next year he was made the sole commander. In September 1339 a French fleet appeared off Sluys, determined to make sail against Edward III's fleet. When eventually they put to sea on 2 October they were blown off course by a violent storm back to the Zet Zwijn roads. Edward met Parliament, and they ordered a new fleet to be granted provisions by the barons of the cinque ports, and commanded by the Admiral of the West, Lord Arundel. Seventy ships from the west met at Portsmouth on March 26, 1340 to be commanded by their new admiral. The earl, granted the commission on 20 February 1340, was joined by fleets from the north and cinque ports. That summer he joined the king on flagship cog Thomas, leaving port two days later on 22 June for Flanders. Arundel was a distinguished soldier, in July 1340 he fought at the Battle of Sluys, during which his heavily laden cog grappled with the Spanish fleet. Summoned by Parliament on 13 July, he bore witness to the victory. By December 1342 Arundel had relinquished his post as admiral.

But it appears he may have been at the siege of Tournai. After a short term as Warden of the Scottish Marches, he returned to the continent, where he fought in a number of campaigns, and was appointed joint lieutenant of Aquitaine in 1340. The successful conclusion of the Flanders campaign, in which Arundel saw little fighting, encouraged the setting up of the Knights of the Round Table—attended every Whitsun by 300 great knights. A former guardian of the Prince of Wales, Arundel was also a close friend of Edward III, and one of the four great earls—Derby, Salisbury, Warwick and himself. With Huntingdon and Sir Ralph Neville he was a Keeper of the Tower and guardian to the prince with a garrison of 20 men-at-arms and 50 archers. A royal councillor, he was expected to raise taxes, which had caused such consternation on 20 July 1338. The King's wars were not alway popular, but Arundel was a vital instrument of that policy. Despite the failure of the peace negotiations at Avignon in 1344, Edward was decided on protecting his Gascon subjects. In early 1345, Derby and Arundel sailed for Bordeaux as lieutenants of the duchy of Aquitaine, attempting to prevent Prince Jean's designs on the tenantry. In August 1346 Derby returned with an army of 2,000 men; while Arundel was responsible for naval preparations.

Admiral of the West 
On 23 February 1345 Arundel was made Admiral of the Western Fleet, perhaps for a second time, to continue the policy of arresting merchant ships, but two years later was again superseded. Arundel was one of the three principal English commanders at the Battle of Crécy, his experience vital to the outcome of the battle with Suffolk and the bishop of Durham in the rearguard. Throughout he was entrusted by the King as guardian of the young Prince Edward. Arundel's division was on the right side of the battle lines, flanked to the right with archers, and stakes to the front.

He spent much of the following years on various military campaigns and diplomatic missions. The king himself and the entourage went to Winchelsea on 15 August 1350, set sail on the cog Thomas on the 28th, for the fleet to chase the Spaniard De la Cerda down wind, which they sighted the following day. The ships rammed, before the party escaped unhurt on another vessel. Overcome by much larger Spanish ships, the English could not grapple.

In a campaign of 1375, at the end of his life, he destroyed the harbour of Roscoff. Only days after the death of Edward III, a Castilian fleet raided the south coast of England, and returned again in August. Arundel's fleet had put into Cherbourg for supplies, but no sooner had it departed then the port was blockaded; one squadron was left behind and captured. At the same, time galleys harassed the coast of Cornwall.

Great wealth 
In 1347, he succeeded to the Earldom of Surrey (or Warenne), which even further increased his great wealth. He did not, however, use the additional title until after the death of the Dowager Countess of Surrey in 1361. He made very large loans to King Edward III but even so on his death left behind a great sum in hard cash.

Marriages and children 
He married twice:
Firstly, on 9 February 1321 at Havering-atte-Bower, to Isabel le Despenser (born 1312, living 1356, and died by 1374/5). At that time, the future earl was about seven, and his bride eight years old. Later he repudiated this bride and was granted an annulment by Pope Clement VI on 4 December 1344 on the grounds that he had been underage and unwilling. By this marriage, Richard and Isabel had one son (when Richard was fifteen, and Isabel sixteen):
 Sir Edmund de Arundel, Knt., of Chedzoy, Martock, Sutton Montagu, and Thurlbear, Somerset; Chudleigh, Devon; Melbury Bubb, Dorset; Bignor, Trayford and Compton, Sussex (c. 1329–1381/2) was the heir to the earldom of Arundel until he was rendered illegitimate by the annulment of his parents' marriage in December 1344. He married before 1347 (betrothed in January 1331 and married probably as a child), Lady Sybil de Montacute (or Montagu), daughter of William Montacute, 1st Earl of Salisbury and Catherine Grandison, whose sister Elizabeth was married to his maternal uncle. Edmund protested his illegitimacy bitterly in 1347 but was apparently ignored. Edmund was subsequently knighted in 1352 at about twenty-three years of age and became an aristocratic knight owning numerous manors throughout the counties of Devon, Dorset, Somerset and Sussex. In 1364 Edmund was going to Flanders on the king's service. In 1368 Pope Urban V sent him to King Edward III to communicate verbally "the present state of the Roman church in Italy". In 1369 and 1370, Edmund fought in several military campaigns in France including the Battle of Pontvallain under the command of his second cousin once removed, Edward the Black Prince, during the Hundred Years' War. After his father's death in 1376, Edmund disputed his half-brother Richard's inheritance of the earldom and associated lands and titles in 1376 and apparently tried to claim the six manors allotted to his deceased mother. He was imprisoned in the Tower of London in 1377, and finally freed through the intervention of two of his brothers-in-law (his wife's brother John de Montacute and the second husband of Elizabeth de Montacute, Lady Le Despencer). Edmund, despite his persistent protests, lost his inheritance. In February 1381, Edmund went to Gascony on a military expedition. Sir Edmund de Arundel died before 12 February 1382. They had three daughters who were his co-heiresses and who brought a failed suit in 1382 against their half-uncle the Earl:
Elizabeth (or Alice) de Arundel, who married Sir Leonard Carew (1343–1369) of Mohuns Ottery in Devon, feudal lord of Carew Castle in Pembrokeshire and lord of the manor of Moulsford in Berkshire. From Alice are descended all the members of the prominent and widespread Carew family, except Carew of Beddington in Surrey, descended from one of Sir Leonard's great-uncles. (See Baron Carew, Earl of Totnes, Carew baronets.)
Philippa de Arundel (died 13 September 1399), who married (as his 2nd wife) Sir Richard Sergeaux, Knt., of Colquite, Cornwall. A Victorian historical novel ascribes the following five children to her: 1. Richard, born 21 December 1376, and died childless, 24 June 1396; 2. Elizabeth, born 1379, wife of Sir William Marny; 3. Philippa, born 1381, wife of Sir Robert Pashley; 4. Alice, born at Kilquyt, 1 September 1384, wife of Guy de Saint Albino; 5. Joan, born 1393, died 21 February 1400. "Philippa became a widow, 30 September 1393, and died 13 September 1399."
Alice Sergeaux, later Countess of Oxford (c. 1386 – 18 May 1452), who married firstly Guy de St Aubyn of St. Erme, Cornwall, and secondly about 1406–7 (as his 2nd wife) the 11th Earl of Oxford and widower of Alice de Holand (d.s.p. 1406, niece of Henry IV), and by him was the mother of two sons:
John de Vere, 12th Earl of Oxford
 Robert de Vere, whose grandson, John, became the 15th Earl of Oxford.
Katherine de Arundel, who married Robert Deincourt.
Secondly on 5 April 1345 he married Eleanor of Lancaster, a young widow, the second-youngest daughter and sixth child of Henry, 3rd Earl of Lancaster and Maud Chaworth. By Papal dispensation he was allowed to marry his first wife's first cousin by their common grandmother Isabella de Beauchamp. Eleanor was the widow of John de Beaumont, 2nd Lord Beaumont. The king, Edward III, himself a kinsman of both wives, attended this second marriage. By now, the Earl of Arundel had rebuilt the family wealth and was apparently a major financier of the Crown, and financial sweeteners may have been used to reconcile both the Church and the Crown. By this second marriage 5 February 1345, Richard and Eleanor had 3 sons and 3 surviving daughters:
Richard Fitzalan, 4th Earl of Arundel, who was his son and heir.
John Fitzalan, 1st Baron Arundel, 1st Baron Maltravers, who was a Marshall of England, and drowned in 1379. The current Duke of Norfolk descends from Lady Mary, Duchess of Norfolk, a daughter and co-heiress of Henry Fitzalan, 12th Earl of Arundel; being a descendant of John FitzAlan, 1st Baron Arundel.
Thomas Arundel, who became Archbishop of Canterbury
Joan Fitzalan (1347 – 7 April 1419) who married Humphrey de Bohun, 7th Earl of Hereford. They were the maternal grandparents of Henry V of England through their daughter Mary de Bohun.
Alice FitzAlan (1350 – 17 March 1416), who married Thomas Holland, 2nd Earl of Kent, matrilinear brother of King Richard II. They were ancestors to Queen consorts Anne Neville (wife of King Richard III), Elizabeth of York (wife of King Henry VII) and Catherine Parr (wife of Henry VII's son Henry VIII).

Illegitimate child by an unknown mistress:
Eleanor Fitzalan, married in or before 1348 (as his 1st wife) John de Bereford of Clapcot, Berkshire, Bickford, Stonythorpe, and Wishaw, Warwickshire, illegitimate son of Edmund de Bereford, Knt. They had no issue.

Probable illegitimate offspring include:
Ranulph FitzAlan, who married a lady named Juliana, last name unknown. Through them descended the Hungerfords, the St. Johns and the Villiers, including Barbara (formerly Palmer) Villiers, the first of many mistresses of King Charles II of England.

Death and legacy
Richard died on 24 January 1376 at Arundel Castle, aged either 70 or 63, and was buried in Lewes Priory. He wrote his will on 5 December 1375. In his will, he mentioned his three surviving sons by his second wife, his two surviving daughters Joan, Dowager Countess of Hereford and Alice, Countess of Kent, his grandchildren by his second son John, etc., but left out his bastardized eldest son Edmund. In his will Richard asked his heirs to be responsible for building the Fitzalan Chapel at Arundel Castle, which was duly erected by his successor.
The memorial effigies depicting Richard Fitzalan and his second wife Eleanor of Lancaster in Chichester Cathedral are the subject of the poem "An Arundel Tomb" by Philip Larkin.

Fitzalan died an incredibly wealthy man, despite his various loans to Edward III, leaving £60,000 in cash. He had been as astute in business as he had in diplomatic politics. He was a cautious man, and wisely saved his estate for future generations.

Ancestry

See also
 "An Arundel Tomb"
 Edward III of England
 Edward the Black Prince
 Admiral of the West
 Battle of Crécy
 Battle of Winchelsea
 Battle of Sluys

Notes

References

Sources
 
 
 
 
 
 

1310s births
1376 deaths
Year of birth uncertain
14th-century English Navy personnel
14th-century English people
Burials at Lewes Priory
10
109
Richard
High Sheriffs of Caernarvonshire
Lord High Admirals of England